The Spilsby branch was a railway line built in Lincolnshire, England by the Spilsby and Firsby Railway Company. It was made to connect the market town of Spilsby with the main line network. It opened in 1868, and was worked by the Great Northern Railway.

The Company was never financially successful, and its proprietors sold it to the Great Northern Railway in 1891. The passenger service was withdrawn as an economy measure on the outbreak of World War II in 1939 and never reinstated, and the line closed completely in 1958.

Beginning
In the early decades of the nineteenth century, Spilsby was a thriving market town. However when the Great Northern Railway opened the East Lincolnshire Line, the line passed some distance from Spilsby. Towns that were directly served by the new railways developed commercially, and Spilsby declined. A meeting at Spilsby in 1864 agreed that a branch line was the solution, and on 5 July 1865 the Spilsby and Firsby Railway Company was authorised.

The new company had difficulty in raising its £25,000 authorised share capital, and the building of the short line of 4 miles and 14 chains was delayed. The line opened on 1 May 1868; there was one intermediate station at Halton Holgate. The Great Northern Railway worked the line for 40% of receipts. The train service was seven trains each way daily; when the Skegness line opened, there was a Sunday service in summer.

The track had been very lightly laid, and had to be renewed (with second hand materials) in 1880.

Operation
The Great Northern Railway had to provide direct financial support of £250 annually to keep the line going, but the agricultural depression of the 1880s pushed the line under, and there remained no option but to sell to the GNR; this took effect on 1 January 1891, by Act of 25 July 1890; the purchase price was £28,000. The line was generally level, but the last three-quarters of a mile to Spilsby climbed at 1 in 66, placing a limitation on the loading of locomotives.

A steam railmotor was tried on the branch in the 1930s, but was unsuccessful.

Closure
On 10 September 1939 the passenger service on the line was suspended as a war economy. The branch closed completely after the passage of the last train on 30 November 1958; the bridge over the Steeping River would have needed reconstruction, and the income on the line could hardly bear the cost.

Location list

 Firsby; main line station;
 Halton Holgate; opened 1 May 1868; closed 11 September 1939;
 Spilsby; opened 1 May 1868; closed 11 September 1939.

See also
Lincolnshire lines of the Great Northern Railway

Notes

References

External links
Photographs of Spilsby station on the Disused Stations website
Local history web site with period photographs
The line on a 1947 Ordnance Survey Map

Railway lines opened in 1868
Railway lines closed in 1958
Rail transport in Lincolnshire
Railway lines closed in 1939